Parliamentary elections were held in Serbia in early March 1893. Although the People's Radical Party had won a large majority in the 1889 elections, by 1893 a Liberal government led by Prime Minister Jovan Avakumović was in place.

The Liberals and People's Radical Party both won 64 seats, with the Progressive Party winning four. However, Liberals had manipulated the elections, which would have otherwise resulted in a majority for the People's Radical Party. As a result, the People's Radical Party threatened to boycott the Assembly, meaning the quorum of 68 members could not be achieved.

A coup d'état was carried out by King Alexander on 13 April, with the Liberal government of Jovan Avakumović removed from office and replaced by a cabinet headed by Lazar Dokić and composed of People's Radical Party members. The National Assembly was dissolved, and fresh elections called.

Results

References

Parliamentary
Serbia
1893 03
Serbia